Prince Edward County (PEC) is a municipality in southern Ontario, Canada. Its coastline on Lake Ontario’s northeastern shore is known for Sandbanks Provincial Park, sand beaches, and limestone cliffs. The Regent Theatre, a restored Edwardian opera house, sits at the heart of the town of Picton on the Bay of Quinte. Nearby Macaulay Heritage Park highlights local history through its 19th-century buildings. In 2016, Prince Edward County had a census population of 24,735. Prince Edward County is a city, single-tier municipality and a census division of the Canadian province of Ontario.

History 
Long settled by indigenous peoples, the county has significant archeological sites. These include the LeVescounte Mounds of the Point Peninsula complex people, built about 2000 years ago.

The county was created by Upper Canada's founding lieutenant-governor John Graves Simcoe on July 16, 1792.  It was named after Prince Edward Augustus, Duke of Kent (the fourth son of King George III and father of Queen Victoria) who was commander-in-chief of British North America.

Shortly after the American Revolution, the Crown made land grants to some of the earliest United Empire Loyalists to encourage their settlements in Ontario and provide compensation for property lost in the Thirteen Colonies.  The county was originally composed of three townships named in honour of three of George III's daughters.

For many years Prince Edward County has been closely associated with the wholly mainland Hastings County. Its longtime militia unit has been The Hastings and Prince Edward Regiment (locally known as the Hasty Ps), whose most famous member was Farley Mowat. This noted author wrote two books about  his experiences with the Hasty Ps during the Second World War's Italian Campaign:  The Regiment and a subsequent account, And No Birds Sang.

On January 1, 1998, the Town of Picton, the villages of Bloomfield and Wellington, and the townships of Ameliasburgh, Athol, Hallowell, Hillier, North Marysburgh, Sophiasburgh, and South Marysburgh amalgamated to form a new city with the official legal name of Prince Edward County. Each of the former municipalities is now a ward.

Former municipalities 

The following are former municipalities:

Ameliasburgh, named after Princess Amelia, youngest daughter of George III
Athol
Bloomfield
Hallowell, named after Captain Benjamin Hallowell (1723–1799)), eminent Loyalist, formerly of Boston. He was the father-in-law of Chief Justice John Elmsley.
Hillier, organized in 1823, and named after Major George Hillier, military secretary to Sir Peregrine Maitland.
North Marysburgh, surveyed in 1785 and settled by Loyalist veterans, some of Hessian birth. Named for Princess Mary, Duchess of Gloucester and Edinburgh, one of George III's daughters.
Sophiasburgh, named for Princess Sophia, one of George III's daughters. Surveyed in 1785 and 1787, settled by Loyalists from Nova Scotia and the Mainland.
South Marysburgh, also named for Princess Mary, Duchess of Gloucester and Edinburgh, one of George III's daughters.
Picton, named for Sir Thomas Picton
Wellington, named after Arthur Wellesley, 1st Duke of Wellington

Geography 

Prince Edward County is located in Southern Ontario on a large irregular headland or littoral at the eastern end of Lake Ontario, just west of the head of the St. Lawrence River. This headland (officially named Prince Edward County in 1792) is surrounded on the north and east by the Bay of Quinte. As the Murray Canal now connects the bay to Lake Ontario across the only land connection, the county is technically an island.  Murray Canal is crossed by 2 swing bridges, the single lane county road 64 bridge and the two lane country road 33 bridge.  Bay of Quinte is crossed by two, 2-lane bridges of about 850m length – one carrying Provincial Highway 62 near Belleville and the other about 24 km east carrying Provincial Highway 49 near Deseronto.

Climate 
The county's relatively mild humid continental climate (Dfb) due to the influence of Lake Ontario has led to the establishment of about 50 vineyards and close to 30 wineries; as a result, Prince Edward County is one of Ontario's designated viticultural areas.  The lake effect from Lake Ontario results in heavier snowfall than in neighbouring counties. July is the hottest month and January is the coldest month.

Landscape 

Communities 
Prince Edward County includes the population centres of Picton and Wellington and the communities of Albury, Ameliasburg, Bloomfield, Carrying Place, Cherry Valley, Consecon, Cressy, Demorestville, Fawcettville, Glenora, Hillier, Lake on the Mountain, Milford, Mountain View, Northport, Rednersville, Rosehall, Rossmore, Salmon Point, Sophiasburgh, Waupoos, Waupoos Island, West Lake, Woodrous, and Yerexville.

Demographics 

Attractions

Music festivals 
Prince Edward County is home to the Prince Edward County Chamber Music Festival, Music at Port Milford Chamber Music Academy & Festival, Classical Unbound Festival, the PEC Jazz Festival, and the Prince Edward County Chamber Music Festival. 

Music at Port Milford, established in 1987, brings together promising young musicians for a chamber music summer camp and festival on the shores of South Bay. In the summer, PEC also hosts the Classical Unbound Festival, with performances of classical music in unconventional venues and contexts by Canadian musicians, and the Jazz Festival in the month of August. Some of Canada's most prolific jazz musicians gather in the county for this festival.

Vacationing 
Prince Edward County has become a vacation destination with Sandbanks Provincial Park, and Ontario's newest VQA wine Appellation as the twin centrepieces of the tourism industry. Hotels, motels and bed & breakfast accommodations are abundant and mostly occupied during the summer months. In addition, many cottages are available such as those offered at Sandbanks Beach Resort.

Water activities 
Prince Edward County's main water attractions are its white sand beaches. Together, Sandbanks Provincial Park, North Beach Provincial Park attract over 600,000 visitors yearly. The numerous campgrounds throughout the County also allow many tourists to enjoy water-sports such as those offered through Westlake Wakeboarding School, kayaking, canoeing, tubing, and more.

Skateboarding and BMXing 
Beside the historic Crystal Palace is the County Youth Park.  While the region is known for a large retirement community, young people now flock to the County to visit the skatepark and playground located in the corner of the Picton Fairgrounds property (which also holds the Picton Arena, the Prince Edward Curling Club & Crystal Palace). For example, the YoungLife youth event "Road Rage" had teens of all ages visiting skateboard parks across Ontario and then entering their homemade skateboarding video into a contest; Picton was one of their stops.

Dining 
Prince Edward County in recent years has become a top culinary destination, from the historic Black River Cheese Company which started operations in 1901 to the new LEED-certified, award-winning Fifth Town Artisan Cheese Factory.

The county held the annual Great Canadian Cheese Festival from 2010 through 2017. This festival, held at the Picton Fairgrounds in June, boasted cheese-makers from all across Canada offering more than 125 artisan cheeses for tasting and purchase. The festival also included non-cheese related artisan foods such as, various breads and condiments, wine, cider and craft beer as well as many other offerings. It has been on hiatus since 2018.

With an increasing number of cultural activities — in part due to the emigration of top artists and chefs to the area – like the "Taste" celebration or "Six Barrels for Six Chefs", the County has created a niche in the new Creative Economy. “It's yet another point of pride for Prince Edward County, which has become the gastronomic capital of Ontario — a fertile island bursting with vineyards, organic farms and a community of artists and chefs. Tucked into the "golden triangle" between Toronto, Montreal and Ottawa, it is the province's newest Designated Viticultural Area, which helps identify the origin of a wine and its grapes.” (The Globe and Mail)

Birding 
Events also include the Spring Birding Festival; Prince Edward County Authors' Festival; the County Jazz Festival, a summer event; the Prince Edward County Music Festival (a chamber music series) held on the same fall weekend as the Prince Edward County Studio and Gallery Tour; "Music at Port Milford," a summer music festival and school for string students from 12–18 years old, and an annual season of professional theatre produced by Festival Players of Prince Edward County.

Theatre 
One of the few surviving art-deco movie houses in Ontario, Picton's downtown Regent Theatre, is host to a variety of plays, musicals and art movie screenings throughout the year. Prince Edward County has a live comedy scene with Taste That! producing regular improv and sketch comedy shows throughout the County since 2015, and the annual Comedy Country festival that pairs local acts with professional comedians from across Canada.  Theatre companies include: the County Stage Company, Prince Edward Community Theatre and The Marysburgh Mummers.

Wineries, distilleries, and cider 
Prince Edward County is home to many wineries, distilleries, and hard-cider companies. These include; Amanda's Vineyards, Black Prince Winery, Broken Stone Winery, Chadsey's Cairns Winery, Cape Winyard, Casa-Dea Estates Winery, Closson Chase Winery, County Cider Company, Del-Gatto Estates Ltd. Devils Wishbone Winery, Domaine Darius, Exultet Estates, Grange of Prince Edward Estate Winery, Gravel Hill Vineyards, Half Moon Bay Winery, Harwood Estate Wineyard, Hillier Creek Estates, Hinterland Wine Company, Hubbs Creek Vineyard, Huff Estates Winery, Karlo Estates, Keint-he Winery & Vineyard, Lacey Estates Winery, Lighthall Vineyards, Norman Hardie Winery, Rosehall Run, Sandbanks Winery, Stanners Vineyard, Sugarbush Vineyard, Thirty Three Vines Winery, Three Dog Winery, Trail Estate Winery, Traynor Family Vineyard, and Waupoos Estates Winery and Vineyard.

Sports

Hockey 
Driving south on Loyalist Highway 33 to the village of Wellington. Proudly displayed on billboards as you arrive in the small town of 1,700 — located 15 kilometers west of Picton in Prince Edward County — is ‘Home of the Dukes.’
Every season for the past dozen years the Wellington Dukes have finished at, or near the top of the II-tier league.

Prince Edward Community Centre located at 375 Main Street is where the Picton Pirates Junior C Hockey Team play their home games, Nicknamed the "Patcheyes", the Picton Pirates were founded in 1989 as members of the Eastern Ontario Junior C Hockey League.

Picton recently won the 2011 Empire "B" Junior C Championship after beating 2nd place Amherstview Jets 4–3 in the best of 7 and 1st place and defending champions Napanee Raiders in their best of seven series 4–2.
In the spring of 2013, The Pirates became the seventh team from Eastern Ontario since the 1930s to win the Ontario Hockey Association's Schmalz Cup, emblematic of Junior C supremacy in the province.
The Pirates defeated the Essex 73's five games to one to capture the OHA title.

Sailing 
Prince Edward County is surrounded by just over 500 km of shoreline offering a dozen or more sheltered harbors and many facilities that cater to boating are located throughout, including full-service marinas.  The County has a rich sailing history which can be discovered at Mariners Park Museum in South Marysburgh.  For those interested in a broader collection of maritime material, Picton is also home to The Archives and Collections Society which offers more than two hundred thousand documents on the Great Lakes and the sea, maritime history and navigation.

The Prince Edward County Yacht Club located in Picton Harbour offers a junior sailing program for children aged 10–18 using monohull dinghies sailing in the pristine water out of Waupoos Marina. PECYC uses CYA certified instructors and successful students are granted CYA certificates.

County Sailing Adventures offer daily sailing cruises out of Waupoos Marina in some of the best fresh water sailing grounds in the world. You can sail the edge of the infamous Marysburgh Vortex or anchor off Little Bluff for lunch and a swim.

Government 

Despite the official name, Prince Edward is not a county by the standard Ontario definition. It is a single-tier municipal government with city status and handles all municipal services.  The former county seat and current council hall is located at the Shire Hall, in Picton. Officially, the area is the smallest single-tier municipality in Ontario and consists of the merged governments of the original county and the 10 former towns, villages and townships, that governed the area until 1997.

Education

Post-secondary 
Prince Edward County is in close proximity to top educational institutions in Kingston and Belleville including Queen’s University, the Royal Military College of Canada, St. Lawrence College and Loyalist College.

Primary and secondary 

The Hastings and Prince Edward District School Board serves close to 17,000 students each day at 46 elementary and eight secondary schools. The district covers a wide geographical area of 7,221 square kilometers bordered by Maynooth to the north, Deseronto to the east, Prince Edward County to the south and Quinte West to the west.

The Algonquin and Lakeshore Catholic District School Board serve students of the Roman Catholic faith. Approximately 15,000 students attend 36 elementary schools and 5 secondary schools in this school district

Sonrise Christian Academy is located at 58 Johnson St. in Picton and offers K–8 education from a Biblical worldview to families in Prince Edward County.

Previously the Prince Edward County Board of Education served the county.

Media

Print 

 Wellington Times (Every Wednesday)
 The Picton Gazette (Every Thursday)
 The County Weekly News (Every Thursday)
 County Live
 County Magazine (Quarterly)

Radio

Emergency services 
The county is served by 1 EMS station of Hastings-Quinte EMS.  Policing is provided from the Ontario Provincial Police detachment located in Picton. The mainly-volunteer Prince Edward County Fire Department operates from ten fire stations located throughout the municipality.

Notable residents 

Guido Basso, flugelhornist
J. D. Carpenter, author
 Gord Downie, lead singer The Tragically Hip is noted as saying during a concert in Belleville, Ontario that he has taken up occasional residence in the County.
Raymond Myers Gorssline, 12th Surgeon General of Canada
 Jamie Kennedy, chef and owner-operator of Jamie Kennedy Kitchens
Janet Lunn, author
John A. Macdonald, first Canadian Prime Minister, lived for three years at Glenora, where his father operated a grist mill. In 1833, Macdonald returned to the Picton area to take over a law practice from his ailing cousin, Lowther P. Macpherson, who was in ill-health. During his stay here, Macdonald became the first secretary of the Prince Edward Young Men’s Society in 1834 and served as secretary of the Prince Edward District School Board. The latter position constituted his earliest experience in the field of public administration.
Kent Monkman, painter and visual artist
Shani Mootoo, artist and author 
Al Purdy, poet who moved to Ameliasburgh in the 1950s.
Bill Reddick, potter
Justin Rutledge, singer-songwriter
Vincent de Tourdonnet, musical theatre writer and director
Astrid Young, singer-songwriter

See also 
 Royal eponyms in Canada
 List of Ontario census divisions
List of townships in Ontario
List of summer colonies

References

External links 

 
Cities in Ontario
Former counties in Ontario
Single-tier municipalities in Ontario
Wine regions of Ontario
Islands of Ontario